The Party of the Reconstruction of the National Order (Portuguese: Partido de Reedificação da Ordem Nacional, PRONA) was a nationalist political party in Brazil. Its electoral code was 56 and its colors were the traditional Brazilian green and yellow. It was founded in 1989 by the cardiologist, professor and politician Enéas Carneiro, who was the president of the party. Its political broadcasts during the pre-election campaigning periods became famous and distinct for the speed in which they were produced due to the very short time the party had available and also because of the use of Beethoven's Fifth Symphony as soundtrack.

The party was strongly identified with the figure of Enéas, who was candidate to the presidency of Brazil in 1989, 1994 and 1998.

The party was extinguished in 2006, shortly before the death of Enéas, being succeeded by the Party of the Republic.

Corruption
The , based on data released by the Superior Electoral Court on 4 October 2007, released a balance sheet containing parties with the largest number of members of the judiciary who had been expelled for corruption since the year 2000. PRONA appeared in last place, with a single expel, tied with the Humanist Party of Solidarity, Green Party and Progressive Republican Party.

References

External links
 Official party website (in Portuguese)

1990 establishments in Brazil
2006 disestablishments in Brazil
Anti-globalization political parties
Defunct political parties in Brazil
National conservative parties
Far-right political parties in Brazil
Nationalist parties in Brazil
Political parties disestablished in 2006
Political parties established in 1990
Right-wing parties in South America
Right-wing politics in Brazil
Social conservative parties
Conservative parties in Brazil